The Kingdom of Orungu (c. 1700–1927) was a small, pre-colonial state of what is now Gabon in Central Africa. Through its control of the slave trade in the 18th and 19th centuries, it was able to become the most powerful of the trading centers that developed in Gabon during that period.

Origins
The Kingdom of Orungu is named for its founders, the Orungu, a Myènè speaking people of unknown origin. Most scholars believe they migrated into the Ogooué River delta in the early 17th century from the south. This is further backed up by the fact that the Orungu seemed to have been heavily influenced by the Kingdom of Loango or at very least its BaVili traders. During this period of migration, the Orungu drove another Myènè speaking people, the Mpongwe, toward the Gabon Estuary in an effort to dominate trade with Europeans. The scheme was successful, and a prosperous kingdom emerged at Cape Lopez.

Government
The Orungu Kingdom was made up of some 20 clans. One of these clans held the line to succession as king, while the others exercised control over maritime commerce coming from the interior. The kingdom was unique in an area where the basic political unit was a clan ruling a village. The Orungu cast this aside for a single big chief/king , which their tradition maintains was descended from a legendary figure called the Mani Pongo The titles of the kingdom's political offices were adopted from the kingdom of Loango as well as a sense of clan hierarchy. These institutions likely moved with the Orungu from the Chilongo district in Loango. The king's title, Agamwinboni, seems to have its origin among the Orungu themselves and does not borrow from the "mani" prefix attached to kingdoms like Loango and Kongo.

Economy
The kingdom of Orungu developed a broker culture thanks to their position on the coast. In the 17th century, the Dutch dominated the coastal trade and ivory was the major export. The Orungu were a metal-working and boatbuilding culture, which allowed them to dominate the riverine trade. Maritime commerce was divided among the non-royal clans and included trades in Ivory, beeswax, dyewood, copal and ebony. By the start of the 19th century, the tiny but wealthy kingdom was able to import slaves from the interior.

Slavery
The Gabon coast, like that of Cameroon, played only a minor role in the Trans-Atlantic Slave Trade compared with the Niger Delta, the Loango coast or the coast of Angola. The export of slaves only became significant in the last 3rd of the 18th century. At the start, the kingdom was a purchaser rather than seller of slaves, which they bought with ivory. Other than slave imports, the kingdom of Orungu also imported iron. By the 1760s, the Orungu were trading in slaves through which the agamwinboni was able to grow rich via taxation on the Nazareth River and San Mexias River. Still, the trade in Orungu territory paled in comparison with its southern neighbor. In 1788, Cape Lopez and the Gabon estuary were exporting around 5,000 slaves per year in contrast to the 13,500 per year exported from Loango's coast. At the beginning of the 19th century, the Fernan Vaz Lagoon south of Cape Lopez supplied large numbers of slaves to the Orungu Kingdom. By the mid 19th century, most prominent coastal groups such as the Mpongwe were not selling their own people, but would raid their neighbors instead. The Orungu, however, often sold debtors, sorcerers, adulterers and cheats to the Portuguese slavers. In 1853, the Orungu monarchy under Chief Ombango-Rogombe agreed to abandon the slave trade; the old slave barracoons (or barracks) near what is now Libreville had already been given to American missionaries. They set up a school and church settlement, which they named Baraka. The Chief then simply moved the slave trade upriver and tried to continue the trade secretly. The trade lasted until the 1870s as illicit slavers sent people from further up the river to Portuguese buyers on the coast.

Culture
Despite their reputation as the most prominent slave traders in the region, some visitors to the kingdom left favorable reviews of the region and its people. John Newton visited the area in 1743 and remarked that they seemed "the most humane and moral people I ever met with in Africa; and they were the people who had the least intercourse with Europe at that time". This must not have remain true for very long. As time passed, the Orungu took on European dress and customs. However, the Orungu people held strongly to their traditional beliefs and were hostile to European missionaries; the mission at Baraka was a diplomatic manoeuvre as part of their negotiations with anti-slavery forces. As a result, few gained western educations thus limiting their influence in colonial administration or post-colonial politics of Gabon. Today, the former slaver tribe is one of Gabon's smaller ethnic groups numbering around 10,000 people.

Decline
The fall of the Orungu Kingdom was directly tied to the European suppression of the slave trade. The king had become dependent on it and was unable to maintain the custom of royal patronage without it. This caused the kingdom to disintegrate and in 1873, Chief Ntchengué signed a treaty granting the French a post on Orungu territory. In 1927, the French had colonized the remnants of the kingdom.

See also
 Rulers of Orungu
 History of Gabon
 Transatlantic slave trade

Footnotes

Sources

History of Gabon
Geography of Gabon
1927 disestablishments in Africa
States and territories established in 1700
States and territories disestablished in 1927
Former monarchies of Africa
1700 establishments in Africa
Former countries in Africa